Samson Joseph Martin (born August 21, 1965) is a former professional American football player who last played with the Indianapolis Colts in the National Football League (NFL) in 1991. He played wide receiver professionally. His one career touchdown as a Wide Receiver came on a 19 yard pass from Steve Grogan on October 28th, 1990. 
His best season came in 1989 when he caught 13 passes for 229 yards. He also contributed on punt and kickoff returns. 

The ,  running back from Louisiana State University was selected by the New England Patriots with the 97th pick in the 1988 NFL Draft.

References

External links
Profile, patriots.com; accessed June 14, 2017.

1965 births
Living people
People from Gretna, Louisiana
Players of American football from Louisiana
LSU Tigers football players
New England Patriots players
Indianapolis Colts players